Gang Du-man (born 12 April 1933) is a South Korean wrestler. He competed in two events at the 1964 Summer Olympics.

References

1933 births
Living people
South Korean male sport wrestlers
Olympic wrestlers of South Korea
Wrestlers at the 1964 Summer Olympics
Place of birth missing (living people)